English slang:
 an abbreviation of "Try It And See"

TIAS or Tias can refer to:
Tías, Las Palmas, a municipality in the Canary Islands
Treaties and Other International Acts Series published by the United States Department of State
Taoyuan International Airport Services Limited
TIAS School for Business & Society, a leading business school in the Netherlands